Jan Vrba (3 June 1937 Prague – 4 November 2020) was a Czech politician who served as Minister of Industry between 1990 and 1992.

Vrba died from COVID-19 in November 2020, during the COVID-19 pandemic in the Czech Republic.

References

1937 births
2020 deaths
Czech politicians
Civic Forum politicians
Civic Movement politicians
Deaths from the COVID-19 pandemic in the Czech Republic
Politicians from Prague
20th-century Czech economists
Industry ministers
Government ministers of the Czech Republic
Czechoslovak economists